Franz Jelinek (19 July 1922 – 20 May 1944) was an Austrian footballer who played as a forward for Wiener Sport-Club and the Germany national team.

Personal life
Jelinek served as a obergefreiter (corporal) in the German Army during the Second World War. He was killed in action in Italy on 20 May 1944 and was buried in Monte Cassino German war cemetery.

References

1922 births
1944 deaths
Footballers from Vienna
Association football forwards
Austrian footballers
German footballers
Germany international footballers
Wiener Sport-Club players
German Army personnel killed in World War II
German Army soldiers of World War II